Anystidae is a family of mites, based on the genus Anystis. The family has a cosmopolitan distribution, and contains "generalist predators found on a variety of habitats".

References

External links

Trombidiformes
Taxa named by Anthonie Cornelis Oudemans
Acari families